Pick is a surname. People with this surname include:

 Albert Pick (1922–2015), German numismatist
 Arnold Pick (1851–1924), Jewish Czech neurologist and psychiatrist
 Frank Pick (1878–1941), British transport administrator
 Georg Alexander Pick (1859–1942), Austrian mathematician
 Lewis A. Pick (1890–1956), United States Army lieutenant general and Chief of Engineers 
 Ludwig Pick (1868–1944), German pathologist
 Lupu Pick (1886–1931), German actor, film director, producer and screenwriter
 Samuel Perkins Pick (1858–1919), English architect
 Svika Pick (born 1949), Israeli popular music composer
 Thomas Pickering Pick (1841–1919), British surgeon and author

See also
 Pick (disambiguation)